Stirling Fessenden (29 September 1875 – 1 February 1944), an American lawyer who practised in Shanghai, was the chairman of the Shanghai Municipal Council from 1923 to 1929 and then Secretary-General of the Council from 1929 to 1939.

Early life
Fessenden was born September 29, 1875 in Fort Fairfield, Maine, United States. The son of Nicholas Fessenden, Judge and later Secretary of State of Maine, and Laura Sterling, he came from a prominent New England family which included Samuel Fessenden, a Massachusetts state senator and US Treasury Secretary William P. Fessenden.

In 1896, he graduated from Bowdoin College with a B.A.  (Bowdoin College, in 1932, awarded him an honorary LLD.)  He studied law in the New York Law School, evening department.

Legal practice in Shanghai
Fessenden came to Shanghai in April 1903 to work as a sub-manager with the American Trading Company.  In 1905, he commenced practicing law in partnership with Mr Thomas R. Jernigan.  In 1907, he was admitted to practice in the newly established United States Court for China. He and Jernigan, were, initially, the only American lawyers to pass the strict bar exam introduced by the new judge, Lebbeus Wilfley. Later he formed a partnership with Major Chauncy Holcomb in the firm of Fessenden & Holcomb. He served as Chairman of the Far Eastern Bar Association in Shanghai for many years.

Shanghai Municipal Council

In 1920, Fessenden was elected a member of Shanghai Municipal Council Board of Trustees and in October 1923 he became chairman of the Municipal Council.

Following the outspring on violence in Shanghai from 1925, he re-organized the Shanghai Volunteer Corps. He created the American Mercantile Company, mostly dealing with Shanghai real-estate in 1925 along with Harry Virden Bernard.

In 1929, Fessenden resigned from his post as Chairman of the Municipal Council and took up the post of Director-General (later Secretary-General) of Municipal Council, charged with the administration of the council.

After the Japanese invasion of China, the Shanghai International Settlement was encircled by Japanese troops.  The Japanese authorities claimed that he conspired with the Americans against Japan.

With effect from June 30, 1939, Fessenden retired from his position with the council due to eye disease.  He was succeeded by G. Godfrey Phillips, the secretary of the Council.

Internment and death
In 1941, when Japan occupied the Shanghai International Settlement at the start of the  Pacific War, the Japanese forced Fessenden to be interned with Russian refugees. After he was completely blind, Chinese servants took care of him.

Fessenden was offered a passage out of Shanghai in September 1943 on the Teia Maru to Goa (where passengers would transfer to the MS Gripsholm to take them back to the United States). However, knowing that he had little time to live, he declined.  He died of a heart ailment, in Shanghai on February 1, 1944.  Fessenden had indicated before his death that he wished to be cremated.  There is no record of his burial in Shanghai, so he presumably was.

References

Further reading

 Empire Made Me: An Englishman Adrift in Shanghai by Robert Bickers
 The Fall of Shanghai by Noel Barber
 Gunboat Justice: British and American Law Courts in China and Japan (1842-1943) by Douglas Clark
 My Twenty Five Years In China by John B Powell
 Hunting opium and other scents by Maurice Springfield (Halesworth: Norfolk and Suffolk Publicity, 1966)
 Shanghai and beyond by Percy Finch
 Shanghai and the edges of Empires by Meng Yue
 Shanghai: Collision Point of Cultures, 1918-1939 by Harriet Sergeant
 Shanghai: The Rise and Fall of a Decadent City, 1842-1949 by Stella Dong
 The Shanghai Green Gang: Politics and Organized Crime, 1919-1937 by Brian G. Martin
 Shanghai splendor : economic sentiments and the making of modern China, 1843-1949 by Wen-hsin Yeh
 Barney, Journals of Harry Virden Bernard, by Barbara B McGee, 1982

American lawyers
Fessenden family
People from Fort Fairfield, Maine
People from Aroostook County, Maine
Bowdoin College alumni
History of Shanghai
Chairmen of the Shanghai Municipal Council
People of the Northern Expedition
1875 births
1944 deaths
American expatriates in China